The Standard Model of particle physics is the theory describing three of the four known fundamental forces (electromagnetic, weak and strong interactions — excluding gravity) in the universe and classifying all known elementary particles. It was developed in stages throughout the latter half of the 20th century, through the work of many scientists worldwide, with the current formulation being finalized in the mid-1970s upon experimental confirmation of the existence of quarks. Since then, proof of the top quark (1995), the tau neutrino (2000), and the Higgs boson (2012) have added further credence to the Standard Model. In addition, the Standard Model has predicted various properties of weak neutral currents and the W and Z bosons with great accuracy.

Although the Standard Model is believed to be theoretically self-consistent and has demonstrated huge successes in providing experimental predictions, it leaves some physical phenomena unexplained and so falls short of being a complete theory of fundamental interactions. For example, it does not fully explain baryon asymmetry, incorporate the full theory of gravitation as described by general relativity, or account for the universe's accelerating expansion as possibly described by dark energy. The model does not contain any viable dark matter particle that possesses all of the required properties deduced from observational cosmology. It also does not incorporate neutrino oscillations and their non-zero masses.

The development of the Standard Model was driven by theoretical and experimental particle physicists alike. The Standard Model is a paradigm of a quantum field theory for theorists, exhibiting a wide range of phenomena, including spontaneous symmetry breaking, anomalies, and non-perturbative behavior. It is used as a basis for building more exotic models that incorporate hypothetical particles, extra dimensions, and elaborate symmetries (such as supersymmetry) to explain experimental results at variance with the Standard Model, such as the existence of dark matter and neutrino oscillations.

Historical background 

In 1954, Yang Chen-Ning and Robert Mills extended the concept of gauge theory for abelian groups, e.g. quantum electrodynamics, to nonabelian groups to provide an explanation for strong interactions. In 1957, Chien-Shiung Wu demonstrated parity was not conserved in the weak interaction.
In 1961, Sheldon Glashow combined the electromagnetic and weak interactions. In 1967 Steven Weinberg and Abdus Salam incorporated the Higgs mechanism into Glashow's electroweak interaction, giving it its modern form.

The Higgs mechanism is believed to give rise to the masses of all the elementary particles in the Standard Model. This includes the masses of the W and Z bosons, and the masses of the fermions, i.e. the quarks and leptons.

After the neutral weak currents caused by Z boson exchange were discovered at CERN in 1973, the electroweak theory became widely accepted and Glashow, Salam, and Weinberg shared the 1979 Nobel Prize in Physics for discovering it. The W± and Z0 bosons were discovered experimentally in 1983; and the ratio of their masses was found to be as the Standard Model predicted.

The theory of the strong interaction (i.e. quantum chromodynamics, QCD), to which many contributed, acquired its modern form in 1973–74 when asymptotic freedom was proposed (a development which made QCD the main focus of theoretical research) and experiments confirmed that the hadrons were composed of fractionally charged quarks.

The term "Standard Model" was first coined by Abraham Pais and Sam Treiman in 1975, with reference to the electroweak theory with four quarks. According to Steven Weinberg, he came up with the term and used it in 1973 during a talk in Aix-en-Provence in France.

Particle content 
The Standard Model includes members of several classes of elementary particles, which in turn can be distinguished by other characteristics, such as color charge.

All particles can be summarized as follows:

Fermions 

The Standard Model includes 12 elementary particles of spin , known as fermions. According to the spin–statistics theorem, fermions respect the Pauli exclusion principle. Each fermion has a corresponding antiparticle.

Fermions are classified according to how they interact (or equivalently, by what charges they carry). There are six quarks (up, down, charm, strange, top, bottom), and six leptons (electron, electron neutrino, muon, muon neutrino, tau, tau neutrino). Each class is divided into pairs of particles that exhibit a similar physical behavior called a generation (see the table).

The defining property of quarks is that they carry color charge, and hence interact via the strong interaction. The phenomenon of color confinement results in quarks being very strongly bound to one another, forming color-neutral composite particles called hadrons that contain either a quark and an antiquark (mesons) or three quarks (baryons). The lightest baryons are the proton and the neutron. Quarks also carry electric charge and weak isospin. Hence they interact with other fermions via electromagnetism and the weak interaction. The remaining six fermions do not carry color charge and are called leptons. The three neutrinos do not carry electric charge either, so their motion is directly influenced only by the weak nuclear force and gravity, which makes them notoriously difficult to detect. By contrast, by virtue of carrying an electric charge, the electron, muon, and tau all interact electromagnetically.

Each member of a generation has greater mass than the corresponding particle of any generation before it. The first-generation charged particles do not decay, hence all ordinary (baryonic) matter is made of such particles. Specifically, all atoms consist of electrons orbiting around atomic nuclei, ultimately constituted of up and down quarks. On the other hand, second- and third-generation charged particles decay with very short half-lives and are observed only in very high-energy environments. Neutrinos of all generations also do not decay, and pervade the universe, but rarely interact with baryonic matter.

Gauge bosons 

In the Standard Model, gauge bosons are defined as force carriers that mediate the strong, weak, and electromagnetic fundamental interactions.

Interactions in physics are the ways that particles influence other particles. At a macroscopic level, electromagnetism allows particles to interact with one another via electric and magnetic fields, and gravitation allows particles with mass to attract one another in accordance with Einstein's theory of general relativity. The Standard Model explains such forces as resulting from matter particles exchanging other particles, generally referred to as force mediating particles. When a force-mediating particle is exchanged, the effect at a macroscopic level is equivalent to a force influencing both of them, and the particle is therefore said to have mediated (i.e., been the agent of) that force. The Feynman diagram calculations, which are a graphical representation of the perturbation theory approximation, invoke "force mediating particles", and when applied to analyze high-energy scattering experiments are in reasonable agreement with the data. However, perturbation theory (and with it the concept of a "force-mediating particle") fails in other situations. These include low-energy quantum chromodynamics, bound states, and solitons.

The gauge bosons of the Standard Model all have spin (as do matter particles). The value of the spin is 1, making them bosons. As a result, they do not follow the Pauli exclusion principle that constrains fermions: thus bosons (e.g. photons) do not have a theoretical limit on their spatial density (number per volume). The types of gauge bosons are described below.
 Photons mediate the electromagnetic force between electrically charged particles. The photon is massless and is well-described by the theory of quantum electrodynamics.
The weak interactions involving the  act only on left-handed particles and right-handed antiparticles. The  carries an electric charge of +1 and −1 and couples to the electromagnetic interaction. The electrically neutral  boson interacts with both left-handed particles and right-handed antiparticles. These three gauge bosons along with the photons are grouped together, as collectively mediating the electroweak interaction.
 The eight gluons mediate the strong interactions between color charged particles (the quarks). Gluons are massless. The eightfold multiplicity of gluons is labeled by a combination of color and anticolor charge (e.g. red–antigreen). Because gluons have an effective color charge, they can also interact among themselves. Gluons and their interactions are described by the theory of quantum chromodynamics.

The interactions between all the particles described by the Standard Model are summarized by the diagrams on the right of this section.

Higgs boson 

The Higgs particle is a massive scalar elementary particle theorized by Peter Higgs in 1964, when he showed that Goldstone's 1962 theorem (generic continuous symmetry, which is spontaneously broken) provides a third polarisation of a massive vector field. Hence, Goldstone's original scalar doublet, the massive spin-zero particle, was proposed as the Higgs boson, and is a key building block in the Standard Model. It has no intrinsic spin, and for that reason is classified as a boson (like the gauge bosons, which have integer spin).

The Higgs boson plays a unique role in the Standard Model, by explaining why the other elementary particles, except the photon and gluon, are massive. In particular, the Higgs boson explains why the photon has no mass, while the W and Z bosons are very heavy. Elementary-particle masses and the differences between electromagnetism (mediated by the photon) and the weak force (mediated by the W and Z bosons) are critical to many aspects of the structure of microscopic (and hence macroscopic) matter. In electroweak theory, the Higgs boson generates the masses of the leptons (electron, muon, and tau) and quarks.  As the Higgs boson is massive, it must interact with itself.

Because the Higgs boson is a very massive particle and also decays almost immediately when created, only a very high-energy particle accelerator can observe and record it. Experiments to confirm and determine the nature of the Higgs boson using the Large Hadron Collider (LHC) at CERN began in early 2010 and were performed at Fermilab's Tevatron until its closure in late 2011. Mathematical consistency of the Standard Model requires that any mechanism capable of generating the masses of elementary particles must become visible at energies above ; therefore, the LHC (designed to collide two  proton beams) was built to answer the question of whether the Higgs boson actually exists.

On 13 March 2013, it was confirmed to be the searched-for Higgs boson.

Theoretical aspects

Construction of the Standard Model Lagrangian 

Technically, quantum field theory provides the mathematical framework for the Standard Model, in which a Lagrangian controls the dynamics and kinematics of the theory. Each kind of particle is described in terms of a dynamical field that pervades space-time.
The construction of the Standard Model proceeds following the modern method of constructing most field theories: by first postulating a set of symmetries of the system, and then by writing down the most general renormalizable Lagrangian from its particle (field) content that observes these symmetries.

The global Poincaré symmetry is postulated for all relativistic quantum field theories. It consists of the familiar translational symmetry, rotational symmetry and the inertial reference frame invariance central to the theory of special relativity. The local SU(3)×SU(2)×U(1) gauge symmetry is an internal symmetry that essentially defines the Standard Model. Roughly, the three factors of the gauge symmetry give rise to the three fundamental interactions. The fields fall into different representations of the various symmetry groups of the Standard Model (see table). Upon writing the most general Lagrangian, one finds that the dynamics depends on 19 parameters, whose numerical values are established by experiment. The parameters are summarized in the table (made visible by clicking "show") above.

Quantum chromodynamics sector 

Since leptons do not interact with gluons, they are not affected by this sector. The Dirac Lagrangian of the quarks coupled to the gluon fields is given by

where
  is the Dirac spinor of the quark field, where i = {r, g, b} represents color,
  are the Dirac matrices,
  is the 8-component SU(3) gauge field,
  are the 3 × 3 Gell-Mann matrices, generators of the SU(3) color group,
  represents the gluon field strength tensor,
  is the strong coupling constant.

Electroweak sector 

The electroweak sector is a Yang–Mills gauge theory with the symmetry group U(1) × SU(2)L,

where
  is the U(1) gauge field,
  is the weak hypercharge – the generator of the U(1) group,
  is the 3-component SU(2) gauge field,
  are the Pauli matrices – infinitesimal generators of the SU(2) group – with subscript L to indicate that they only act on left-chiral fermions,

Notice that the addition of fermion mass terms into the electroweak Lagrangian is forbidden, since terms of the form  do not respect U(1) × SU(2)L gauge invariance. Neither is it possible to add explicit mass terms for the U(1) and SU(2) gauge fields. The Higgs mechanism is responsible for the generation of the gauge boson masses, and the fermion masses result from Yukawa-type interactions with the Higgs field.

Higgs sector 

In the Standard Model, the Higgs field is a complex scalar of the group SU(2)L:

where the superscripts + and 0 indicate the electric charge of the components. The weak hypercharge of both components is 1.

Before symmetry breaking, the Higgs Lagrangian is

which up to a divergence term, (i.e., after partial integration) can also be written as

This is not included in the table above because it can be derived from the mass (after symmetry breaking) and the vacuum expectation value.

Yukawa sector 
The Yukawa interaction terms are

Fundamental interactions

The Standard Model describes three of the four fundamental interactions in nature; only gravity remains unexplained. In the Standard Model, such an interaction is described as an exchange of bosons between the objects affected, such as a photon for the electromagnetic force and a gluon for the strong interaction. Those particles are called force carriers or messenger particles.

Gravity 

Despite being perhaps the most familiar fundamental interaction, gravity is not described by the Standard Model, due to contradictions that arise when combining general relativity, the modern theory of gravity, and quantum mechanics. However, gravity is so weak at microscopic scales, that it is essentially unmeasurable. The graviton is postulated as the mediating particle.

Electromagnetism 

Electromagnetism is the only long-range force in the Standard Model. It is mediated by photons and couples to electric charge. Electromagnetism is responsible for a wide range of phenomena including atomic electron shell structure, chemical bonds, electric circuits and electronics. Electromagnetic interactions in the Standard Model are described by quantum electrodynamics.

Weak nuclear force 

The weak interaction is responsible for various forms of particle decay, such as beta decay. It is weak and short-range, due to the fact that the weak mediating particles, W and Z bosons, have mass. W bosons have electric charge and mediate interactions that change the particle type (referred to as flavour) and charge. Interactions mediated by W bosons are charged current interactions. Z bosons are neutral and mediate neutral current interactions, which do not change particle flavour. Thus Z bosons are similar to the photon, aside from them being massive and interacting with the neutrino. The weak interaction is also the only interaction to violate parity and CP. Parity violation is maximal for charged current interactions, since the W boson interacts exclusively with left-handed fermions and right-handed antifermions.

In the Standard Model, the weak force is understood in terms of the electroweak theory, which states that the weak and electromagnetic interactions become united into a single electroweak interaction at high energies.

Strong nuclear force 

The strong nuclear force is responsible for hadronic and nuclear binding. It is mediated by gluons, which couple to color charge. Since gluons themselves have color charge, the strong force exhibits confinement and asymptotic freedom. Confinement means that only color-neutral particles can exist in isolation, therefore quarks can only exist in hadrons and never in isolation, at low energies. Asymptotic freedom means that the strong force becomes weaker, as the energy scale increases. The strong force overpowers the electrostatic repulsion of protons and quarks in nuclei and hadrons respectively, at their respective scales.

While quarks are bound in hadrons by the fundamental strong interaction, which is mediated by gluons, nucleons are bound by an emergent phenomenon termed the residual strong force or nuclear force. This interaction is mediated by mesons, such as the pion. The color charges inside the nucleon cancel out, meaning most of the gluon and quark fields cancel out outside of the nucleon. However, some residue is "leaked", which appears as the exchange of virtual mesons, that causes the attractive force between nucleons. The (fundamental) strong interaction is described by quantum chromodynamics, which is a component of the Standard Model.

Tests and predictions 
The Standard Model predicted the existence of the W and Z bosons, gluon, top quark and charm quark, and predicted many of their properties before these particles were observed. The predictions were experimentally confirmed with good precision.

The Standard Model also predicted the existence of the Higgs boson, which was found in 2012 at the Large Hadron Collider, the final fundamental particle predicted by the Standard Model to be experimentally confirmed.

Challenges 

Self-consistency of the Standard Model (currently formulated as a non-abelian gauge theory quantized through path-integrals) has not been mathematically proven.  While regularized versions useful for approximate computations (for example lattice gauge theory) exist, it is not known whether they converge (in the sense of S-matrix elements) in the limit that the regulator is removed.  A key question related to the consistency is the Yang–Mills existence and mass gap problem.

Experiments indicate that neutrinos have mass, which the classic Standard Model did not allow. To accommodate this finding, the classic Standard Model can be modified to include neutrino mass.

If one insists on using only Standard Model particles, this can be achieved by adding a non-renormalizable interaction of leptons with the Higgs boson. On a fundamental level, such an interaction emerges in the seesaw mechanism where heavy right-handed neutrinos are added to the theory.
This is natural in the left-right symmetric extension of the Standard Model and in certain grand unified theories. As long as new physics appears below or around 1014 GeV, the neutrino masses can be of the right order of magnitude.

Theoretical and experimental research has attempted to extend the Standard Model into a unified field theory or a theory of everything, a complete theory explaining all physical phenomena including constants. Inadequacies of the Standard Model that motivate such research include:
 The model does not explain gravitation, although physical confirmation of a theoretical particle known as a graviton would account for it to a degree. Though it addresses strong and electroweak interactions, the Standard Model does not consistently explain the canonical theory of gravitation, general relativity, in terms of quantum field theory. The reason for this is, among other things, that quantum field theories of gravity generally break down before reaching the Planck scale. As a consequence, we have no reliable theory for the very early universe.
 Some physicists consider it to be ad hoc and inelegant, requiring 19 numerical constants whose values are unrelated and arbitrary. Although the Standard Model, as it now stands, can explain why neutrinos have masses, the specifics of neutrino mass are still unclear. It is believed that explaining neutrino mass will require an additional 7 or 8 constants, which are also arbitrary parameters.
 The Higgs mechanism gives rise to the hierarchy problem if some new physics (coupled to the Higgs) is present at high energy scales. In these cases, in order for the weak scale to be much smaller than the Planck scale, severe fine tuning of the parameters is required; there are, however, other scenarios that include quantum gravity in which such fine tuning can be avoided. There are also issues of quantum triviality, which suggests that it may not be possible to create a consistent quantum field theory involving elementary scalar particles.
 The model is inconsistent with the emerging Lambda-CDM model of cosmology. Contentions include the absence of an explanation in the Standard Model of particle physics for the observed amount of cold dark matter (CDM) and its contributions to dark energy, which are many orders of magnitude too large. It is also difficult to accommodate the observed predominance of matter over antimatter (matter/antimatter asymmetry). The isotropy and homogeneity of the visible universe over large distances seems to require a mechanism like cosmic inflation, which would also constitute an extension of the Standard Model.

Currently, no proposed theory of everything has been widely accepted or verified.

See also 

 Yang–Mills theory
 Fundamental interaction:
 Quantum electrodynamics
 Strong interaction: Color charge, Quantum chromodynamics, Quark model
 Weak interaction: Electroweak interaction, Fermi's interaction, Weak hypercharge, Weak isospin
 Gauge theory: Introduction to gauge theory
 Generation
 Higgs mechanism: Higgs boson, Alternatives to the Standard Higgs Model
 Lagrangian
 Open questions: CP violation, Neutrino masses, QCD matter, Quantum triviality
 Quantum field theory
 Standard Model: Mathematical formulation of, Physics beyond the Standard Model
 Electron electric dipole moment

Notes

References

Further reading

Introductory textbooks

Advanced textbooks 
  Highlights the gauge theory aspects of the Standard Model.
  Highlights dynamical and phenomenological aspects of the Standard Model.
 
  920 pages.
  952 pages.
   670 pages.  Highlights group-theoretical aspects of the Standard Model.

Journal articles

External links 

 "The Standard Model explained in Detail by CERN's John Ellis" omega tau podcast.
 The Standard Model on the CERN website explains how the basic building blocks of matter interact, governed by four fundamental forces.
 Particle Physics: Standard Model, Leonard Susskind lectures (2010).

 
Concepts in physics
Particle physics